The 2023 Russian Women's Football Championship is the 32nd season of the Russian women's football top-level league. Zenit Saint Petersburg are the defending champion.

Teams

Results

Regular season

Top scorers

References

2022
Russia
Russia
Women
Women